The 2015 Irving Tennis Classic was a professional tennis tournament played on hard courts. It was the fourth edition of the tournament which was part of the 2015 ATP Challenger Tour. It took place in Irving, United States between 17 and 22 March 2015.

Singles main draw entrants

Seeds

 1 Rankings as of March 9, 2015

Other entrants
The following players received wildcards into the singles main draw:
  Jérémy Chardy
  Sergiy Stakhovsky
  Édouard Roger-Vasselin
  Michael Russell

The following players received entry from the qualifying draw:
  Bjorn Fratangelo
  Marco Cecchinato
  Kyle Edmund
  Johannes Schretter

Champions

Singles

 Aljaž Bedene def.  Tim Smyczek, 7–6(7–3), 3–6, 6–3

Doubles

 Robert Lindstedt /  Sergiy Stakhovsky def.  Benjamin Becker /  Philipp Petzschner, 6–4, 6–4

References
 Combined Main Draw

External links
Official Website

Irving Tennis Classic
Irving Tennis Classic
Irving